Eric Taylor (June 17, 1897 – September 8, 1952) was an American screenwriter with over fifty titles to his credit. He began writing crime fiction for the pulps before working in Hollywood. He contributed scripts to The Crime Club, Crime Doctor, Dick Tracy, Ellery Queen, and The Whistler series, as well as six Universal monster movies.

Career
Taylor wrote for various pulp magazines in the 1920s and 30s, including Black Mask, Clues, and Dime Detective. He published seven stories with Black Mask: "Jungle Justice" (1928), "The Murder Rap" (1928), "Boulevard Louis" (1928), "A Pinch of Snuff" (1929), "Red Death" (1935), "Murder to Music" (1936), and "The Calloused Hand" (1936).

In 1936, Taylor began writing for newly-formed Republic Pictures. Over the next three years he received a credit on six Republic movies and one with Universal. Beginning in 1939, Taylor began working with producers Larry Darmour and Rudolph Flothow. Taylor's first assignments under Darmour and Flothow were a number of action-adventure movies starring Jack Holt. From 1940 to 1942, Taylor contributed to eight Ellery Queen movies for Columbia Pictures. In 1942, Columbia replaced Ellery Queen with two other mystery series, both based on radio programs: The Crime Doctor and The Whistler. Taylor wrote on six Crime Doctor and two Whistler movies. From 1941 to 1946, Taylor also contributed to six Universal monster movies, including entries in the Frankenstein and Dracula series. He wrote two Dick Tracy movies for RKO Pictures in 1945 and 1947. In the 1950s he returned to Republic Pictures where he wrote six more movies, five of which were Westerns.

In the early 1950s Taylor prolifically wrote many episodes for the American television series 'The Roy Rogers Show, The Adventures of Kit Carson  and  Ramar of the Jungle.

Personal life
Little is known of Taylor's personal life. He was born in Chicago in 1897 and died in 1952 in San Francisco of a heart attack while on vacation with his wife.

Works

1953 White Goddess (episodes of  Ramar of the Jungle edited into a feature film)
1952 Big Jim McLain1952 Colorado Sundown 
1951 Pals of the Golden West1951 South of Caliente1951 Heart of the Rockies1950 North of the Great Divide1950 Destination Big House1949 Prison Warden1949 The Devil's Henchman1949 The Secret of St. Ives1947 Dick Tracy Meets Gruesome1946 Crime Doctor's Man Hunt1946 The Lie Detector1946 Mysterious Intruder1946 The Spider Woman Strikes Back1946 Just Before Dawn1945 Splitface1945 Doctor's Warning1945 The Doctor's Courage1944 Shadows in the Night1944 The Whistler1943 Strangest Case1943 Son of Dracula1943 Phantom of the Opera1943 No Place for a Lady1942 The Lido Mystery1942 A Desperate Chance1942 The Ghost of Frankenstein1942 A Close Call1941 The Murder Ring1941 The Perfect Crime 
1941 The Black Cat1941 The Great Swindle1941 Ellery Queen's Penthouse Mystery1940 Ellery Queen, Master Detective1940 Mutiny of the Seas1940 Black Friday1939 Fugitive at Large1939 Trapped in the Sky1938 Orphans of the Street1938 His Exciting Night1938 Romance on the Run1938 The Case of the Missing Blonde1937 The Wrong Road1937 Jim Hanvey, Detective1937 Navy Blues1936 Happy Go Lucky''

References

External links

1897 births
1952 deaths
American male screenwriters
Writers from Chicago
Writers from San Francisco
Screenwriters from California
Screenwriters from Illinois
20th-century American male writers
20th-century American screenwriters